Dalreoch is an area of Dumbarton, to the west of the River Leven, in West Dunbartonshire, Scotland.

The area is served by Dalreoch railway station.

References 

Dumbarton